Cristopher Benjamín Toselli Ríos (born 15 June 1988) is a Chilean footballer who plays as a goalkeeper for Universidad de Chile.

Toselli is best known for beating Cláudio Taffarel's clean sheet record of 484 minutes during 2007 FIFA U-20 World Cup of Canada, surpassing him by eight minutes and completing 492 minutes in total, helping Chilean youth squad to a third-place finish. In 2009, he was a member of Ivo Basay's 23-man squad who won the Toulon Tournament, a tournament that Cristopher lost in 2008 against Italy under Marcelo Bielsa as coach.

Club career

Universidad Católica

Early career
Born in Antofagasta, Toselli joined Universidad Católica youth ranks in 2001, being promoted to first-team by the coach Jorge Pellicer in 2006 for the Torneo Apertura, due to the departure of second-choice keeper Rainer Wirth to Deportes Temuco. The following year, after a notable performance in the FIFA U-20 World Cup, he made his club debut on 25 November, during a 3–0 home win to Coquimbo Unido played at San Carlos. The next season, he was challenging the goal with record-man José María Buljubasich, becoming the first-choice keeper, after their mistakes and its departure to Olimpia.

When he played the 2009 Toulon Tournament final against France, that Chile won 1–0 to Les Blues, Toselli suffered a strong injury of six months, that caused indignation Católica's coach Marco Antonio Figueroa for provide him to a tournament and take risk, because he was Figueroa's starter keeper. During his recovery time, second-choice keeper Paulo Garcés broke into first team, therefore relegated him to the bench.

2010 season
On 5 December 2010, Toselli played in the Primera División final match against Everton, where his club was consecrated champion after defeat 5–0 to Viña del Mar based–team at home.

2011 season
On 11 May 2011, he recovered his titularity under orders of Juan Antonio Pizzi after a terrible mistake of Garcés in a Copa Libertadores quarterfinals match against Peñarol at Montevideo, where inexplicably dropped the ball, which Alejandro Martinuccio take the opportunity for score the definitive 2–0 in the 90th minute. After losing against Universidad de Chile the playoffs finals of the Torneo Apertura, was installed again as starter keeper with the new coach Mario Lepe, after the departures of Pizzi and Garcés. On 16 November, Toselli won the Copa Chile final to Magallanes, being that his second title at Católica, that qualified his team 2012 Copa Sudamericana, which Los Cruzados were eliminated on semifinals against Brazilian side São Paulo after two draws, where Toselli had very well performances.

International career

During his early career, Toselli represented Chile U17 at the 2005 South American U-17 Championship, playing in four matches. Later, Toselli was called up to the Chile U20 national team for the 2007 South American Youth Championship in Paraguay. He started in the national team as second goalkeeper until the third game of tournament, in where he relegates to the Colo-Colo player Richard Leyton to his place. Finally, Chile finished in the fourth place of the final stage of the tournament with six points alongside Paraguay, however the guaranies had a lower goal difference of Chile, giving the pass to Chile to the 2007 FIFA U-20 World Cup celebrated in Canada.

In the U-20 World Cup, Toselli was Chile's outstanding goalkeeper with a notable performance by him and his team in the cup, finishing in the third place of the tournament, after beating 1–0 Austria. However, he broke Brazilian goalkeeper Cláudio Taffarel's record of 484 minutes without conceding goals in a Youth World Cup, achieving 492 minutes in total, eight more than the Brazilian.

After of his U-20 World Cup performances, he was nominated to the Toulon Tournament in France three years consecutively (2008–2010). In 2008 (U23 squad), Toselli was nominated by the coach Marcelo Bielsa and once was Chile's outstanding goalkeeper, being runner-up of the tournament with Chile, after of be defeated 1–0 by Italy. In 2009 (U21 squad), he was once again nominated to play the Toulon Tournament, which Chile would win, suffering a six-month injury in the final against the France, which Chile won 1–0 with a goal from Gerson Martínez at 86th minute. In 2010 (U22 squad), Chile reached the fourth place.

In addition, Toselli played in a friendly match against Mexico U22 in San Luis Potosí, Mexico on September 3, 2011. The squad only included under-25 players and was a win by 1–3.

Toselli was called up by Bielsa to play his first senior international game for his country against Panama, match that ended in a 2–1 victory of Chile. During the 2010 FIFA World Cup qualification process, he was nominated by Bielsa as third goalkeeper with frequency. For the 2010 FIFA World Cup, it was supposed that Toselli would be the third goalkeeper of Chile, but finally Luis Marín was who achieved this place. Toselli would be called up by Bielsa's successors Claudio Borghi and Jorge Sampaoli during the 2014 World Cup qualifiers and was eventually included in the 23-man squad that played the World Cup.

Career statistics

Club

International

Honours

Club
Universidad Católica
 Primera División (5): 2010, 2016–C, 2016–A, 2019, 2020
 Copa Chile (1): 2011
 Supercopa de Chile (2): 2016, 2019
 Friendlies (1): Torneo de Verano Fox Sports 2019

International
Chile U20
 FIFA U-20 World Cup: Third Place 2007

Chile U21
 Toulon Tournament (1): 2009

Chile
 Copa del Pacífico (1): 2012
 Copa América (1): 2016
 Confederations Cup: Runner-up 2017
 China Cup (1): 2017

Individual
 Best goalkeeper of Toulon Tournament (1): 2009
 Chilean Footballer of the Year (1): 2013

References

External links
 

1988 births
Living people
Chilean footballers
Chilean expatriate footballers
People from Antofagasta
Chilean people of Italian descent
Association football goalkeepers
Chile under-20 international footballers
Chile youth international footballers
Chile international footballers
2014 FIFA World Cup players
Copa América Centenario players
2017 FIFA Confederations Cup players
Copa América-winning players
Club Deportivo Universidad Católica footballers
Atlas F.C. footballers
Everton de Viña del Mar footballers
Club Deportivo Palestino footballers
Central Córdoba de Santiago del Estero footballers
Chilean Primera División players
Liga MX players
Chilean expatriate sportspeople in Mexico
Chilean expatriate sportspeople in Argentina
Expatriate footballers in Mexico
Expatriate footballers in Argentina